Toni Amboaje is a Spanish-born singer former metal band Sauze member, which formed in early 2008 and currently  the lead singer for AMBOJE.

History
Amboaje discovered his passion for music when he was only four years old, during the 1980s while listening to his parents' favorite singer Bruce Springsteen and band Dire Straits, this marked his influences to be a musician. It was not until 1992 that he discovered Bryan Adams's Waking Up the Neighbours that changed the way he thought of music leading him to play the guitar, write and sing his own songs.

Amboaje was self-taught and bought his own electric guitar in 1998, forming a band along with a friend of his, Gus Velasco. After some years improving themselves, learning how to play in a more professional way, decide the style and recruit the correct members, it's formed on mid 2002 the metal band Hard Spirit.

Already on Hard Spirit he lived processes of creation and evolution of a band, after more than 50 concerts in Spain, winning the award for best vocalist on Villa de Bilbao, Hard Spirit released their debut album Walk the Wild with good critics reception. That same year Amboaje participated in an AOR project from Jaén Hardleywood's band, where he co-wrote and sang on 3 songs. On late 2007 he accepted Ardines, Mon and Ramil's invitation to join them as lead vocalist for alternative metal band Sauze, where he participated on debut album Nada Tiene Sentido, released on June 1, 2008.

Toni signed with Global Music Group [GMG] USA in late 2015 to release the band's latest LP "All About Living".

Discography

With Hard Spirit
Walk the Wild - 2007

With Sauze
Nada Tiene Sentido - 2008
El Mejor Momento - 2009

With AMBOAJE 
All About Living - 2016

External links
 Label - Global Music Group 
 Official Band Website

1981 births
Living people
Spanish rock singers
Place of birth missing (living people)
21st-century Spanish singers
21st-century Spanish male singers